Henryk Gronowski (9 March 1928 – 10 May 1977) was a Polish professional football player and manager. He spent the majority of his career with Lechia Gdańsk, before going on to have brief spells in management. His brother, Robert Gronowski was also a former professional footballer who played as a forward.

Early years

Having been born in Gliwice in 1928, which was then in Germany, Henryk was born as Henryk Gruner. He later changed his last name in 1949 to the more Polish sounding Gronowski.

Senior career

After World War 2 Gronowski joined the newly established football team of his birth city Piast in Gliwice, which had now been integrated into Poland. In 1949 Gronowski joined Lechia Gdańsk with his elder brother, Robert. Gronowski spent a total of 12 seasons at Lechia, playing over 200 games in all competitions. In 1961 Gronowski moved to Australia to play for Polonia Melbourne and Polonia Sydney, Football teams which had been created by Polish nationals who had moved to Australia. After the two seasons away Gronowski once again returned to Lechia Gdańsk and spent a further 6 years with the club. In total Gronowski spent 18 seasons at Lechia and made 273 appearances in all competitions.

International career

In 1957 Gronowski played for Poland, in what turned out to be his only international appearance. He played against Finland in a 4-0 win, keeping a clean sheet for his country.

Managerial career

After his playing career had finished Gronowski fully went into management. He took charge firstly of Wisła Tczew, before going on to manage Gedania Gdańsk.

Personal life

Gronowski is commemorated by a star at the MOSiR Stadium in Gdańsk. The "Avenue of Stars" commemorates the efforts and success of former players and coaches.

References

1928 births
1977 deaths
Sportspeople from Gliwice
Lechia Gdańsk players
Piast Gliwice players
Lechia Gdańsk managers
Polish footballers
Poland international footballers
Association football goalkeepers
Polish football managers
Western Eagles FC players